Carrington Public Schools are a system of a publicly funded schools serving the cities of Carrington, Grace City, Sykeston and Woodworth, and the surrounding rural areas in North Dakota, United States. There is an elementary school and a high school in Carrington. The district administration offices are also in Carrington. The superintendent is Brian Duchscherer.

Carrington Grade School

Carrington Grade School is a public elementary school located in Carrington, and is a part of the Carrington Public Schools system.

Information

History

Carrington Grade School uses the historic Lincoln Building for some classes. The Lincoln Building was torn down between June 2008 and July 2008.

Carrington High School
Carrington High School is a public high school located in Carrington. The athletic teams are known as the Cardinals. The school colors are red and white.

Information

Championships
North Dakota High School Activities Association championships:
State Class 'B' boys' basketball: 1995, 2010
State Class 'B' girls' basketball: 2010, 2011
 State Class 'B' football: 1981, 1988
State Class 'B' wrestling: 1987, 1988, 1991, 1992, 1994, 1995
State Class 'B' girls' track and field: 1999, 2000, 2001, 2002, 2003, 2004
State Class 'B' boys' track and field: 1982

Notable alumni
 Jim Kleinsasser - player for the Minnesota Vikings
 Stephanie Tollefson - Miss North Dakota USA 2008; attended Carrington High School for 10th-12th grade

External links

Carrington, North Dakota
School districts in North Dakota
North Dakota High School Activities Association (Class B)
North Dakota High School Activities Association (Class AA Football)
Education in Foster County, North Dakota
Education in Wells County, North Dakota
Education in Stutsman County, North Dakota